Fake Can Be Just as Good is the third studio album by American alternative rock band Blonde Redhead. It was released on March 11, 1997 by Touch and Go Records.

Track listing

Personnel
Credits are adapted from the album's liner notes.

Blonde Redhead
 Kazu Makino – guitar, vocals
 Amedeo Pace – guitar, vocals
 Simone Pace – drums, keyboards

Additional musicians
 Vern Rumsey – bass

Production
 Blonde Redhead – production
 John Goodmanson – production, recording
 John Siket – mixing on "Bipolar" and "Oh James"
 Howie Weinberg – mastering

References

External links
 
 

1997 albums
Blonde Redhead albums
Albums produced by John Goodmanson
Touch and Go Records albums